Martín Alund and Horacio Zeballos were the defending champions but Zeballos decided not to participate.
Alund teamed up with Facundo Bagnis but lost to eventual champions Máximo González and Diego Sebastián Schwartzman in the first round. 

González and Schwartzman went on to win the title, defeating Rogério Dutra da Silva and André Ghem in the final, 6–3, 7–5.

Seeds

Draw

Draw

References
 Main Draw

Copa Topper - Doubles
2013 Doubles